Sandra Roma (born 31 March 1990) is a former tennis player from Sweden.

In her career, she won three singles titles and five doubles titles on the ITF circuit. On 15 April 2013, she reached her best singles ranking of world No. 431. On 16 November 2009, she peaked at No. 416 in the doubles rankings.

Career
Roma reached a career-high ranking in juniors of 11 in September 2008. Alongside Nikola Hofmanova, she reached the semifinals of the doubles draw of the Wimbledon Championships in 2007.
She teamed up with Noppawan Lertcheewakarn and reached the final of the 2008 US Open girls' competition in doubles, as the third seeds, and won against Mallory Burdette and Sloane Stephens.

In May 2009, Roma reached her first senior women's final where she lost to Amanda Carreras. She won her first professional title in Tampere, beating talented junior Anna Orlik in the final.

Comeback from injury 2011
Roma had surgery on her back in the Autumn of 2009, and returned to match play in November 2010 playing team tennis for her homeclub of SALK. In her first match back she defeated Camilla Lundberg in straight sets.

Roma made her ITF comeback in Tallinn, where she qualified and lost in the first round of the main draw. Another loss followed to Mona Barthel at Roma's home tournament in Stockholm. Roma then won four matches in qualifying for the main draw in Antalya, where she was knocked out in the second round of the main draw. The following week she again qualified by winning four matches.

Fed Cup
Roma has represented Sweden in the Fed Cup twice, playing in a doubles match partnering Ellen Allgurin against Romania in 2009, and another doubles match partnering Anna Brazhnikova against Switzerland in 2011. She won both matches.

ITF finals

Singles (3–2)

Doubles (5–2)

References

External links
 
 
 

1990 births
Living people
Tennis players from Stockholm
Swedish female tennis players
US Open (tennis) junior champions
Grand Slam (tennis) champions in girls' doubles
20th-century Swedish women
21st-century Swedish women